The 2022 Oklahoma gubernatorial election was held on November 8, 2022, to elect the governor of Oklahoma. Incumbent Republican Governor Kevin Stitt was re-elected to a second term, defeating his Democratic challenger Joy Hofmeister. former Republican state senator Ervin Yen ran as an independent, and Natalie Bruno was the Libertarian nominee.

Although Stitt won by a comfortable margin, and even expanded his margin from 2018, his performance was the worst of any 2022 Republican candidate for statewide office in Oklahoma. Meanwhile, Hofmeister's performance was the second best of any 2022 Democratic statewide candidate in Oklahoma, only behind State Superintendent of Public Instruction nominee Jena Nelson.

The primary elections for the Republican and Democratic parties' nominations took place on June 28, 2022. The deadline for candidates to file was April 15, 2022.

Republican primary

Candidates
Ervin Yen, former State Senator from the 40th district, was the first to declare their campaign for the Republican Party of Oklahoma's nomination on November 8, 2020. Yen later publicly announced on October 19, 2021, that he was leaving the Republican Party of Oklahoma. He criticized the party's opposition to mask and vaccine mandates for COVID-19, saying "The Oklahoma GOP has left me."

Incumbent Kevin Stitt was reported as joining the race in January 2021 after officially filing for re-election.

Mark Sherwood, a naturopath, was reported as joining the race in September 2021. His platform includes a "zero tolerance policy" for vaccine and mask mandates, stating "I believe the concept of vaccine and mask mandates needs to end."

Joel Kintsel announced his candidacy on April 7. Moira McCabe was reported to have launched their campaign around the same time.

In early June, Stitt's campaign pulled one of its commercials after Oklahoma County District Attorney, David Prater announced an investigation into whether it violated state law for featuring Oklahoma Attorney General John O'Connor. While pulling the ad, the campaign maintained they "are confident that it is an acceptable campaign ad focused on the Governor's accomplishments and fulfilled campaign promises."

Incumbent Kevin Stitt won the June 28 Republican primary.

Nominee
Kevin Stitt, incumbent Governor (2019–present)

Eliminated in primary
Joel Kintsel, director of the Oklahoma Department of Veteran Affairs and former Oklahoma House of Representatives’ parliamentarian
Moira McCabe, "stay-at-home mom"
Mark Sherwood, naturopath and former Tulsa Police Department officer

Withdrew before filing
Ervin Yen (switched to Independent)

Declined
T. W. Shannon, former Speaker of the Oklahoma House of Representatives (2013–2014) and former state representative (2007–2015) (running for the Class 2 U.S. Senate seat)

Endorsements

Polling

Results

Democratic primary

Former state senator Connie Johnson was the first Democrat to enter the race, officially declaring her candidacy on July 6, 2021. Her platform includes expanding access to healthcare, revitalizing Oklahoma's infrastructure, pursuing criminal justice reforms like banning the death penalty, support for reproductive rights, and legalizing marijuana (marijuana is currently legal in Oklahoma for medicinal purposes, but is illegal for recreational use). A political progressive, Johnson was the only Oklahoma superdelegate who supported Vermont Senator Bernie Sanders in the 2016 presidential primary.

On October 7, 2021, Oklahoma State Superintendent of Public Instruction Joy Hofmeister announced her plans to switch from the Republican Party to the Democratic Party and run for governor. Hofmeister had first been elected as a Republican in 2014 and 2018. This marked the first time that a Democrat held a statewide elected position in Oklahoma since Republicans swept every statewide office in 2010. Hofmeister had frequently clashed with Republican governor Kevin Stitt during the COVID-19 pandemic. In particular, she opposed the decision by the Oklahoma State Department of Education, whose members were appointed by Stitt, to forego imposing a mask mandate on schools. Her platform includes increasing education funding, investing in infrastructure, expanding mental health services, sentencing reform, and support for abortion rights.

Johnson was openly skeptical of Hofmeister's decision to change parties, calling it a "big hoax." She pointed out that Hofmeister could still switch back to the Republican Party after being elected. However, other Democrats in the state were more receptive, with the Oklahoma Democratic Party issuing a statement welcoming Hofmeister to the party. Oklahoma Democratic Party chair Alicia Andrews admitted she was suspicious at first, but after talking with Hofmeister she became convinced that Hofmeister's intentions were good. Hofmeister emphasized that she was not changing her political beliefs, just her party, and is considerably more moderate in comparison to Johnson. Andrews commented that they are "two very different candidates," and they give Democratic voters "a real choice. If you don’t have a super progressive bent and maybe Connie scares you because she is so progressive, you have Joy. If Joy is too moderate, you have Connie."

Candidates

Nominee
Joy Hofmeister, Oklahoma State Superintendent of Public Instruction (2015–present)

Eliminated in primary
Connie Johnson, former state senator (2006–2014), former vice chair of the Oklahoma Democratic Party (2015–2016), nominee for the U.S. Senate in 2014 and candidate for governor in 2018

Declined
Monroe Nichols, state representative (2016–present)
Anastasia Pittman, former state senator (2014–2018) and nominee for Lieutenant Governor of Oklahoma in 2018 (running for Oklahoma County Commission)

Polling

Results

General election

Candidates
Kevin Stitt (Republican)
Joy Hofmeister (Democratic)
Natalie Bruno, digital marketing strategy executive (Libertarian)
Ervin Yen, physician and former Republican state senator (2014–2018) (Independent)

Declared, but failed to file
Paul Tay, perennial candidate (Independent)

Debates

Endorsements

Predictions

Polling
Aggregate polls

Graphical summary

Results

See also 
 2022 Oklahoma elections

Notes

Partisan clients

References

External links
Official campaign websites
 Natalie Bruno (L) for Governor
 Joy Hofmeister (D) for Governor
 Kevin Stitt (R) for Governor
 Ervin Yen (I) for Governor

2022
Oklahoma
Governor